Sinutor is a genus of sea snails, marine gastropod mollusks in the family Calliostomatidae within the superfamily Trochoidea, the top snails, turban snails and their allies.

Notes
Additional information regarding this genus:
 Taxonomic Remark: Some authors use Sinutor Cotton & Godfrey, 1935 as a subgenus in Calliostoma Swainson, 1840

Species

The following species were brought into synonymy:
 Sinutor incertus (Reeve, 1863) accepted as Calliostoma incertum (Reeve, 1863)

References

External links
 To World Register of Marine Species

Calliostomatidae
Monotypic gastropod genera